Radical is an extinct town in Stone County, in the U.S. state of Missouri. The GNIS classifies it as a populated place.

A post office called Radical was established in 1878, and remained in operation until 1944. The community was named for the fact a large share of the first settlers were Radical Republicans in politics.

References

Ghost towns in Missouri
Former populated places in Stone County, Missouri